Zainal Abidin Ahmad may refer to:
 politicians:
 Zainal Abidin Ahmad (Malaysian politician) (1939–2010), Malaysian politician
 Zainal Abidin Ahmad (Indonesian politician) (1911–1983), Indonesian politician
 Zainal Abidin Ahmad (writer) (1895–1973), Malaysian writer